"Monochrome" is the third single by Ammonia, from their second album Eleventh Avenue. It was released in February 1998 on the Murmur record label.

Track listing
"Monochrome" – 2:08
"Union City Blues" – 3:29
"Sunrise" – 3:27
"Monochrome (The Mono Mix)" – 5:38

References

1998 singles
Ammonia (band) songs
1998 songs
Murmur (record label) singles